Casco Junction is an unincorporated community located in the town of Luxemburg in Kewaunee County, Wisconsin. The community was an important railroad outpost for the Ahnapee and Western Railway where Casco Junction acted as the southern terminus of the railroad. Today the now defunct railroad's track has been converted to a walking trail that connects the village of Luxemburg to Algoma and Sturgeon Bay via the Ahnapee State Trail.

References

Unincorporated communities in Wisconsin
Unincorporated communities in Kewaunee County, Wisconsin